Greenville Air Force Base may refer to:

The former name of Donaldson Air Force Base
Greenville Air Force Base (Mississippi), a former United States Air Force base in Mississippi